Olga Mesmer is a superpowered fictional character in a pulp magazine's comic strip published from 1937 to 1938. Like the newspaper comic-strip character Popeye (1929) and novelist Philip Wylie's protagonist Hugo Danner (1930), she is among the precursors of the archetypal comic-book superhero, Superman.

Publication history

Olga Mesmer, "The Girl with the X-ray Eyes", starred in a single-page comic strip that ran in issues of the pulp magazine Spicy Mystery Stories cover-dated August 1937 to October 1938. The first story, "The Astounding Adventures of Olga Mesmer, the Girl with the X-Ray Eyes", and subsequent installments are by an unidentified writer. Art for the strip, created at a comics studio run by Adolphe Barreaux, is credited to Watt Dell, who sometimes signed his illustrations for the magazine as Watt Dell Lovett, and may be a pseudonym; as well, some of the Mesmer strips are signed "Stone".

Powers and abilities
Mesmer's X-ray vision stemmed from experiments done on her Venusian mother, Margot, by her mad-scientist father, Dr. Hugo Mesmer, who exposed Margot to radiation.

Legacy
With scientifically enhanced super-strength and X-ray vision, but no separate alter ego and with her powers kept secret, she nonetheless is considered by comics historian Will Murray as "the superhero before Superman", though an  addition about her mother's extraterrestrial origin may have come only after Superman's debut. More generally, writes historian Peter Coogan, she is considered a precursor:

References

Further reading

 The Spectacular Sisterhood of Superwomen: Awesome Female Characters from Comic Book History by Hope Nicholson, Quirk Books (2017)

1937 comics debuts
1938 comics endings
Mesmer, Olga
Comics characters introduced in 1937
Mesmer, Olga
Mesmer, Olga
Mesmer, Olga
Fiction set on Venus
Comics about women
Mesmer, Olga
American comic strips
Fiction about X-ray vision
Superhero comic strips
Comic strip superheroes
Characters in pulp fiction